APAF1-interacting protein is a protein that in humans is encoded by the APIP gene. It is an enzyme with Methylthioribulose 1-phosphate dehydratase activity which is involved in the methionine salvage pathway.

APIP deficiency is associated with cell death and cancer.

Interactions 

APIP has been shown to interact with APAF1.

References

External links

Further reading